The Brown House is a 19th-century house in Yuma, Arizona, built of brick in the 1890s.

It was built in 1893 by F. B. Wightman.  It was deemed significant in 1982 as "a well preserved example of a lodging house from the turn of the century. It has been used principally by railroad men as a stopover between Los Angeles and Tucson. In 1907 C. L. Brown acquired the property and used it as a family home until 1943. With the exception of reshingling the roof, and enclosing the breezeway between the kitchen and main building, the structure is little changed from its original appearance. Situated on a rise at the south end of the historic district the house is a prominent landmark."

The house was listed on the U.S. National Register of Historic Places in 1982.  It may be a contributing property included within Yuma Crossing and Associated Sites, a U.S. National Historic Landmark.

See also
 List of historic properties in Yuma, Arizona 
 National Register of Historic Places listings in Yuma County, Arizona

References

External links

 Landmark Hunter: Brown House — includes photo, map, and National Register information.

Buildings and structures in Yuma, Arizona
Houses in Yuma County, Arizona
Houses completed in 1893
Houses on the National Register of Historic Places in Arizona
National Register of Historic Places in Yuma County, Arizona